Nottingham Concert Band (NCB) claims to be the largest community windband in the Nottingham (UK) area, and performs regularly throughout the county and beyond.

Based in West Bridgford, South Nottingham, it is independent and entirely self-financing. The band draws on a diversity of musical styles, from classical transcriptions to contemporary compositions and from film and show compilations to big band favourites.

History
Part of the musical landscape of the East Midlands since 1991 Nottingham Concert Band began life as Trent Concert Band which in turn arose from the music department of Trent Polytechnic (now Nottingham Trent University). Since 1993, the band has been led by Conductor & Musical Director Robert Parker.

Performances 
Nottingham Concert Band has established a year-round programme of formal evening concerts, plus a busy Summer season of outdoor engagements. Appearances in the recent past have included

West Bridgford Proms in the Park
Nottingham Playhouse
Nottingham Arts Theatre
De la Beche Theatre, Keyworth
Goose Fair, Nottingham
Southwell Minster
Center Parcs, Sherwood
RAF Waddington International Airshow
Bingham Town Fair
Christmas in Nottingham’s Old Market Square
Fund-raising events for various charities
Summer fetes for local schools and community festivals
Bandstand concerts in Nottingham, Newark, Melton Mowbray, Loughborough, Long Eaton, Grantham, Stamford, Ilkeston and Bourne.

Conductor, musical director
Robert Parker
A Graduate and Fellow of Trinity College London, where he studied horn and piano, Robert performs professionally in a wide diversity of contexts. He also teaches brass both privately and in Nottinghamshire schools and is the county representative for the Trinity Guildhall examinations board.

Associate conductor
Ashley Parnell

Chairman
Jeff Fry
Fry plays bass clarinet in the band and has been chairman for several years <since when?>.

Members
Band membership stands currently at over 60 musicians, who come from all across the East Midlands and who range in age from 17 to 70-plus.

External links
Official website

Culture in Nottingham
Concert bands
Wind bands
Musical groups established in 1991
Musical groups from Nottinghamshire
1991 establishments in England